Heinrich Barnes (born 12 December 1986, in Pretoria) is a male freestyle wrestler from South Africa. He participated in Men's freestyle 66 kg at 2008 Summer Olympics. He was eliminated in the 1/16 of final losing to Mongolian Buyanjavyn Batzorig.  He also competed in collegiate wrestling for two years at Oregon State University where he earned All-American status placing 8th in the 2009 NCAA Championships.

External links
 Wrestler bio on beijing2008.com

Living people
1986 births
Olympic wrestlers of South Africa
Oregon State Beavers wrestlers
South African male sport wrestlers
Wrestlers at the 2008 Summer Olympics
Sportspeople from Pretoria
Wrestlers at the 2010 Commonwealth Games
Commonwealth Games medallists in wrestling
Commonwealth Games silver medallists for South Africa
Medallists at the 2010 Commonwealth Games